Acrocercops paliacma is a moth of the family Gracillariidae, known from Meghalaya and Assam, India, as well as Vietnam. It was described by Edward Meyrick in 1930.

References

paliacma
Moths of Asia
Moths described in 1930